The Nurses Registration Act was passed on 12 September 1901 in New Zealand, providing for the registration of trained nurses.
 
The legislation came into effect on 1 January 1902, leading New Zealand to become the first country in the world to regulate nurses nationally. On 10 January 1902 Ellen Dougherty became the first registered nurse in New Zealand, and in the world.

Like other New Zealand acts requiring registration of professions there was a transition or grandfather clause allowing registration of nurses with at least four years experience even if they did not have the training specified for new nurses by the act and regulations (see clause 5 of act).

See also
Health care in New Zealand
Nurses Registration Act 1919 (United Kingdom law)

References

Statutes of New Zealand
1901 in New Zealand law
Repealed New Zealand legislation
Nursing in New Zealand